Roboforge is a strategy game developed by Liquid Edge and released in 2001.

Brief history
RoboForge is a video game released in 2001 by Liquid Edge, a small company mainly created to develop and sell this game.
The company's founder, Darren Green, was inspired by the well known Robot Wars (TV series). He noticed that Robot Wars was an interesting game, but the cost of a real bot and the know-how required drastically restricted its spread, so he decided to virtualize Robot Wars concepts into a new PC game, calling it RoboForge.

RoboForge introduced an innovative concept: build your own robot (also called "bot" or "bots") on a limited virtual cost budget, then enter it into an arena with one other robot and run a full 3D robot battle until a robot's CPU or chassis is destroyed or time is called. Liquid Edge announced the game in July, 2000  and then released the first version on May 23, 2001.

From July 2008 RoboForge became an open-source project with the Java-based source code available under a non-commercial license. The game's community continues development and it is now possible to download the game, build bots and enter them into amateur tournaments for free.

Reception
Since 2001 RoboForge attracted the interest of many gaming review websites as well as gaming magazines, The general consensus was that RoboForge wasn't an "easy" game and that it required a lot of time and effort to build competitive robots.

References

External links
 New website
 roboforge repository on SourceForge (empty)

Programming games
Programming contests
Robotics simulation software
Video games about robots
2001 video games
2001 in robotics
Commercial video games with freely available source code
Java platform games
Video games developed in the United Kingdom